Kaare Sparby (25 June 1904 – 23 October 2001) was a Norwegian politician for the Conservative Party.

He served as a deputy representative to the Norwegian Parliament from Hedmark during the term 1945–1949.

He was an engineer by profession.

References

1904 births
2001 deaths
Conservative Party (Norway) politicians
Deputy members of the Storting
Hedmark politicians